Sweetwater Creek is an unincorporated community in Hillsborough County, Florida, United States. It is part of the census-designated place (CDP) of Town 'n' Country. The ZIP code for the community is 33634.

Sweetwater Creek reported as an "unincorporated place" by the U.S. Census Bureau in 1970, which included much of Town 'n' Country census area. The population in 1970 was 19,453.

Geography
Sweetwater Creek is located at 28 degrees north, 82.6 degrees west (27.999, -82.559); or approximately eight miles northwest of Tampa. The elevation of the community is 7 feet above sea level.

Education
The community of Sweetwater Creek is served by Hillsborough County Schools.

References

External links
Sweetwater Creek Property Owners Association 
Sweetwater Creek profile from Hometown Locator

Unincorporated communities in Hillsborough County, Florida
Former census-designated places in Hillsborough County, Florida
Unincorporated communities in Florida
Former census-designated places in Florida